Podocarpus henkelii (Henkel's yellowwood) is a South African species of conifer in the family Podocarpaceae. It is grown ornamentally in gardens for its strikingly neat, attractive form and its elegant, drooping foliage.

Description
An attractive ornamental tree, this is one of the most recognisable of the yellowwoods. It can easily be distinguished from its close relatives by its long, slender, drooping leaves. It has a straight, well-formed trunk and naturally assumes a pyramid-shape as it grows, eventually becoming very tall (30m).

Like all yellowwoods, this tree is dioecious, with separate male and female trees. As conifers they produce cones, although it is their fruit-like seeds that are most prominent. These seeds are eaten and distributed by birds. The fleshy coating of the seed contains a germination inhibitor so being eaten actually helps germination by removing this coating.

Distribution
Henkel's yellowwood is found in South Africa, in the KwaZulu-Natal and Eastern Cape provinces. Here it grows in the high, moist, afro-montane forest of the Drakensberg mountains. In addition it is now found in gardens throughout South Africa, where it is grown as an elegant ornamental tree.

It is a protected tree in South Africa. Although it is the real yellowwood tree that is officially South Africa's national tree, the yellowwoods as a group – including Henkel's yellowwood – are felt to hold that position in practise.

Name and cultivation
This tree was named after Caesar Carl Hans Henkel (1839–1913), the Eastern Cape forester, and father of John Spurgeon Henkel, Conservator of Forests for Natal and Zululand.

Podocarpus henkelii is increasingly grown in gardens around southern Africa for its neat, attractive form and decorative foliage. It is easy to cultivate, tough once established, and incredibly long-lived. It can also be pruned if necessary, to change its shape.
However, although it is mildly frost and drought resistant, it is healthiest (and grows fastest) when planted in deep, moist soils.

It can be propagated from seed, which should be planted promptly in a moist, semi-shade position. The fleshy fruit that surrounds the seed must be removed as this inhibits germination. The seed is also vulnerable to fungal infection.

Henkel's yellowwood is a protected tree in South Africa.

Potential uses
Acetone and methanol extracts of Podocarpus henkelii have shown activity against canine distemper virus and  lumpy skin disease virus.

References

 Protected Trees of South Africa
 Henkels Yellowwood on PlantZAfrica.com

Afromontane flora
Flora of the Cape Provinces
Flora of KwaZulu-Natal
Least concern plants
Ornamental trees
Plants used in traditional African medicine
henkelii
Protected trees of South Africa
Taxonomy articles created by Polbot